Giulio Fantuzzi (born 17 September 1950) is an Italian politician.

He is a member of the Democratic Party. He has served as mayor of Reggio Emilia from 1987 to 1991. He was elected mayor of Correggio from 1975 to 1980.

He was a member of the Agriculture Commission. He was elected coordinator of the Democratic Party for the province of Reggio Emilia in 2007.

He was elected provincial secretary by the Reggio Democratic Party in 2008.

He was a member of the European Parliament from 1989 to 1999.

Biography
Giulio Fantuzzi was born in Reggio Emilia, Italy in 1950.

See also
 List of mayors of Reggio Emilia

References 

1950 births
Living people
University of Bologna alumni
People from Reggio Emilia
Democratic Party (Italy) politicians
21st-century Italian politicians
20th-century Italian politicians
Mayors of Reggio Emilia